Louis R. Oshins (c. 1902 – August 6, 1975) was an American football coach. He served as the head football coach at Brooklyn College from the inception of the school's football program in 1927 thought the 1947 season.

Oshins played college football at the City College of New York (CCNY). He died of cancer on died on August 6, 1975, at his home in Belize.

Head coaching record

References

Year of birth missing
1900s births
1975 deaths
American football halfbacks
Brooklyn Kingsmen football coaches
CCNY Beavers football players
Coaches of American football from New York (state)
Players of American football from New York (state)
Deaths from cancer in Belize